K231 or K-231 may refer to:

K-231 (Kansas highway), a former state highway in Kansas
HMCS Calgary (K231), a former Canadian Navy ship
, an organisation of former political prisoners in 1968 Czechoslovakia

See also
Leck mich im Arsch, by W A Mozart; K.231 in the Kochel catalogue